The 2014 Rugby Europe Women's Trophy was held in Belgium. It was held from October 30 to November 2, 2014. Netherlands won the tournament.

Qualification play-off

Main Tournament

First round

3rd Place

Final

References

2014
2014 rugby union tournaments for national teams
2014–15 in European women's rugby union
2014
2014–15 in Belgian rugby union